The 1964 United States presidential election in Mississippi was held on November 3, 1964, as part of the 1964 United States presidential election, which was held on that day throughout all fifty states and the District of Columbia. Voters chose seven electors, or representatives to the Electoral College, who voted for president and vice president. 

The Republican Party nominee, Senator Barry Goldwater of Arizona, won Mississippi with a lopsided 74.28% margin of victory against the Democratic Party nominee, incumbent President Lyndon B. Johnson, making the state a staggering 97% more Republican than the national average. Goldwater was the first Republican to carry the Magnolia State since Reconstruction. Whilst Goldwater would suffer a landslide defeat to Johnson, his performance in Mississippi would ironically be the best Republican showing in the state's presidential electoral history and would be the only time that a Republican presidential candidate would carry every county in the state. Despite Incumbent Democratic Senator John C Stennis Easily winning re-election  on the same ballot without opposition in the general election .

Background
In a state where fewer than ten percent of Black people were registered voters, and an almost entirely white electorate had lost none of its hostility towards the Civil Rights Movement, President Johnson's policies on civil rights were anathema. Governor Paul B. Johnson Jr., though considered relatively liberal for such reforms as repealing statewide Prohibition, told Mississippians not to obey the Civil Rights Act when it became law in the middle of 1964, while it was clear from the time Johnson planned his legislation that Mississippi white Democrats resented federal intervention with the state's traditional racial policy.

Neither Governor Johnson nor any other major state or federal politician offered President Johnson any support in his statewide campaign, which was left to the inexperienced Greenville lawyer Douglas Wynn. Although Governor Johnson and four of five Congressmen were silent about supporting Goldwater, John Bell Williams did support the Republican and left President Johnson's inexperienced and makeshift campaign team with no hope against the state's electorate. Over ninety percent of Mississippi's electorate viewed President Johnson as having done a bad job and 96.4 percent opposed the Civil Rights Act vis-à-vis only 54 percent in all antebellum slave states plus Oklahoma. 87 percent of Mississippi voters, vis-à-vis 48 percent in the South as a whole, believed that President Johnson was failing at countering domestic Communism. This concern with domestic Communism reflected the belief, widespread among Mississippi whites for over three decades, that civil rights activists were funded by Communist parties, whether domestic or Soviet.

Polls
Opinion polls in July amongst registered Mississippi voters giving their opinions of Johnson and Goldwater, and by professional pollsters in August, both showed clearly that Johnson possessed no chance of keeping Mississippi in the Democratic column where it had solidly been since 1876. This despite the fact that George Wallace – who would win the state as a third-party candidate in the following election – decided not to run in July, and plans to place unpledged Democratic electors on the ballot as had been done for the preceding two elections (and who would have been expected to support Wallace this time) were abandoned.

In July, polling suggested Goldwater would receive ninety percent of Mississippi's vote, but this fell to seventy in August and to between sixty and sixty-five in October due to fears he would abolish the Rural Electrification Administration that had played an important role in developing Mississippi. By the weekend before election day, University of California political scientist Peter H. Odegard believed Goldwater would win only Alabama and Mississippi and had doubts even with those two.

Vote
When the national Democratic Party previously took positions on civil rights viewed too radical, Mississippi's white population's extreme traditional hostility to the Republican Party caused the Magnolia State to elect "states' rights" Democrats and unpledged Democratic electors in 1948 and 1960 respectively. Despite their hostility to the "Republican" label in the past, Goldwater's support for "constitutional government and local self-rule" meant that the absence from the ballot of such third parties mattered little. The Arizona Senator had been one of only six Republicans to vote against the Civil Rights Act, and Goldwater's staunchly conservative policies, which alienated the traditional Northeastern Republican heartland to the point of completely abandoning the GOP, were adequate for the small Mississippi electorate to almost unanimously support him over Johnson. In addition to his unacceptable record on racial issues, Mississippi whites also felt that Johnson was doing a very bad job of keeping taxes and spending low.

Amidst a landslide national defeat for Goldwater, he nonetheless defeated President Johnson by a margin of 74.28%, comparable to what had been predicted in the earliest polls and much greater than predicted immediately before the election. Over-representation of urban areas in polling was blamed for this discrepancy. Goldwater's victory in Mississippi made him only the second Republican presidential nominee to carry the state as well as the first one since Ulysses S. Grant in 1872. His 87.14% in the popular vote made it his strongest state in the 1964 election.

Goldwater won all of Mississippi's eighty-two counties, the most recent candidate to do so as of the 2020 presidential election, and won fifty-one with over ninety percent of the vote. Even in the poor white northeastern hills where residual support for Johnson remained based on fear of Goldwater dismantling public works, Goldwater exceeded sixty percent in every county.

Goldwater's percentage margin is the largest statewide percentage victory by any Republican presidential nominee since that party formed, while no state has been won by so large a margin since. In four counties, Goldwater received a larger proportion of the vote than any presidential nominee has subsequently received in one county. , this is the last election in which Claiborne County, Holmes County, and Jefferson County voted for a Republican presidential nominee (as 8 years later, Richard Nixon would win all but those three counties in the state).

Results

Results by county

References

Notes

Mississippi
1964 Mississippi elections
1964